Christian Träsch (born 1 September 1987) is a German former professional footballer who played as a right-back or defensive midfielder.

Club career
Träsch had his professional debut on 3 February 2008 against Schalke 04. He scored his first goal for VfB Stuttgart on 5 October 2008 against Werder Bremen from a 25-meter volley.

On 21 January 2009, he extended his contract at VfB Stuttgart until the summer of 2012.

On 25 July 2011, Träsch moved to VfL Wolfsburg.

On 25 October 2014, Träsch played 89 minutes in a reserve team match where he scored a 10th-minute goal.

On 30 May 2015, he played as Wolfsburg won the German Cup for the first time defeating Borussia Dortmund 3–1 at the Olympic Stadium, Berlin.

Träsch announced his retirement from playing in October 2020 aged 33. He appeared in over 240 matches in the top two divisions of the German football pyramid.

International career
Träsch was nominated on 19 May 2009 to the senior Germany squad for a tour of Asia. He made his debut on this tour in a match against United Arab Emirates on 2 June. He was substituted on in the 79th minute for Andreas Hinkel. His tenth and last international match was a 3-3 between Ukraine and Germany on 11 November 2011 in Kyiv.

Career statistics

Honours
1860 Munich
 Under 17 Bundesliga: 2005–06

VfL Wolfsburg
 DFB-Pokal: 2014–15
 DFL-Supercup: 2015

References

External links

1987 births
Living people
Association football fullbacks
Association football midfielders
German footballers
German expatriate footballers
Germany international footballers
TSV 1860 Munich players
TSV 1860 Munich II players
VfB Stuttgart players
VfB Stuttgart II players
VfL Wolfsburg players
FC Ingolstadt 04 players
Al-Wasl F.C. players
Bundesliga players
2. Bundesliga players
3. Liga players
Regionalliga players
UAE Pro League players
Expatriate footballers in the United Arab Emirates
German expatriate sportspeople in the United Arab Emirates
Footballers from Bavaria